The 1965–66 Athenian League season was the 43rd in the history of Athenian League. The league consisted of 48 teams.

Premier Division

The division featured two new teams, both promoted from last seasons Division One:
 Slough Town  (1.)
 Hemel Hempstead Town (2.)

League table

Division One

The division featured 3 new teams:
 1 relegated from last seasons Premier Division:
 Redhill (16.)
 2 promoted from last seasons Division Two:
 Harwich & Parkeston (1.)
 Bishop's Stortford (2.)

League table

Division Two

The division featured 4 new teams:
 1 relegated from last seasons Division One:
 Epsom & Ewell (16.)
 3 joined the division:
 Lewes, from Sussex County League
 Marlow, from Spartan League
 Ruislip Manor, from Spartan League

League table

References

1965–66 in English football leagues
Athenian League